Frank Mayborn Enterprises is a domestic profit industry in Texas. It was the founder and publisher of Killeen Daily Herald newspaper and Temple Daily Telegram.

Formations 
Mayborn enterprises is formed in December 1978 and was registered as a domestic for profit cooperation in Texas States Secretariat by Frank Mayborn. The industry based on Publishing newspapers with more than 300 employees with $42.09 million having five companies.

Notes

Further reading 

 Frank W Mayborn, the broadcaster, newspaper publisher owner, soldier. Found: Frank Mayborn Enterprises Inc, white side radio station in Texas, Temple Belly County. Texas History Online, Military Encyclopedia
 The history of Frank W. Mayborn ; Frank Mayborn Enterprise, 1939 - 1987. Texas newspaper mogul
 Handbook of Texas History; The mogul Mayborn of Dallas Dispatch, Daily Temple Telegram, Killeen Daily Herald

Sources 
 

1978 establishments in Texas
Companies based in Texas
Publications established in 1978